Shawnee Mountain is a family oriented ski resort in eastern Pennsylvania located right outside East Stroudsburg, Pennsylvania, I-80, exit 309, next to the Delaware River in the easternmost part of The Poconos.

The mountain has a total of 23 trails, the longest of which is 5,100 feet (1,554 m), and two terrain parks. The Delaware and Country Club terrain parks features jumps, boxes and rails. Shawnee has 23 slopes and trails, two terrain parks, and a snow-tubing park with a total area of 125 acres.

Shawnee Mountain has nine lifts. Its main lift is a high speed-Detachable chairlift from Doppelmayr CTEC that was bought in 2010. The Tomahawk installation took the alignment of the Arrowhead chairlift, a Partek lift which was relocated from its original 1996 alignment. This lift in turn had replaced the original Borvig Arrowhead and Tomahawk doubles. There is a double-double chairlift (two chairlifts together). Partek renovated this 80s-era Borvig installation in 2001. Normally, only one of the doubles is open. There is another Borvig double chairlift (only one) called the Bushkill Chairlift that takes people over the Bushkill and Benekill trails. This is a very narrow chairlift and the longest one. Then at the beginner's hill, there is another small Borvig double chairlift. Next to it is a magic carpet lift. Then at the learning center is another magic carpet. Also, there is a snowtubing magic carpet and 6 tubing lanes.

The mountain also features 100% snow making, night skiing and snow tubing. The ski area was opened in 1975 when Karl Hope purchased the Shawnee Inn and established the ski area. Olympic gold medalist Jean-Claude Killy was employed as director of ski operations which helped with initial publicity.

In 2013 and 2014, Shawnee was able to open late November due to an early snow season. Typically, skiing is open until some time in March.

The base building houses lounges, restaurants and bars, rental and repair shops, locker facilities and offices. There is an additional lodge at the summit which offers a bar and food. A ski school is on the premises and also a world renown children's program for kids as young as 3 and up to 15 years old.

References

External links
Shawnee Mountain Ski Area official website

Ski areas and resorts in Pennsylvania
Pocono Mountains
1975 establishments in Pennsylvania
Buildings and structures in Monroe County, Pennsylvania
Tourist attractions in Monroe County, Pennsylvania